Marion Township is a township in Marshall County, Iowa, USA.

History
Marion Township was established in 1854.

References

Townships in Marshall County, Iowa
Townships in Iowa